Bojidar Georgiev Iskrenov (born 1 August 1962), nicknamed Gibona (Гибона means "The Gibbon"), Gibi (Гиби) and The Joy of the People (Радостта на народа), is a former Bulgarian footballer who spent most of his career playing for Levski Sofia as a forward.

Iskrenov also had a brief film career. He appeared in the movie Manevri na petiya etazh as the elevator technician.

Career
A native of the capital Sofia, Iskrenov played for Levski between 1979 and 1989, scoring 58 goals in 208 matches. He was then transferred to the Spanish Real Zaragoza in 1989-1990, but could not establish himself in the first team and went on as a Lausanne Sports player in Switzerland in 1990–1991. Spells at Botev Plovdiv (1991–1992), CSKA Sofia and PFC Shumen (1994) followed, with Iskrenov ending his career at Septemvri Sofia (1994–1995).

Iskrenov won the top Bulgarian league, the A PFG, three times (all with Levski): in 1984, 1985 and 1988, as well as the Bulgarian Cup in 1982, 1984 and 1986 (with Levski) and 1993 (with CSKA). He played a total of 263 matches and scored 58 goals in the A PFG. A very skillful player, known for his feints as well as the ability to shoot with both legs, Iskrenov was also nicknamed Radostta na naroda (Радостта на народа; "The Joy of the people").

International career
For the Bulgaria national team, Bojidar Iskrenov has 50 matches and 5 goals, debuting on 28 October 1981 in a 0–3 defeat by Brazil and retiring from international football on 12 May 1993 after a 2–2 draw between Bulgaria and Israel in Sofia. He played at the 1986 FIFA World Cup in Mexico, when Bulgaria reached the round of 16.

Honors
 Club
Levski Sofia

 Bulgarian League – 1979, 1984, 1985, 1988
 Bulgarian Cup – 1979, 1982, 1984, 1986
 Cup of the Soviet Army – 1984, 1987, 1988

 International
Bulgaria

 1986 FIFA World Cup – 15th place

References

External links

 Profile at LevskiSofia.info

1962 births
Living people
Bulgarian footballers
Bulgaria international footballers
Footballers from Sofia
PFC Levski Sofia players
Real Zaragoza players
FC Lausanne-Sport players
Botev Plovdiv players
PFC CSKA Sofia players
FC Septemvri Sofia players
First Professional Football League (Bulgaria) players
La Liga players
Bulgarian expatriate footballers
Expatriate footballers in Spain
Expatriate footballers in Switzerland
Continental Indoor Soccer League players
Washington Warthogs players
1986 FIFA World Cup players
Bulgarian expatriate sportspeople in Spain
Bulgarian expatriate sportspeople in Switzerland
Bulgarian expatriate sportspeople in the United States
Association football midfielders